Tridentichnus is an ichnogenus of fossil footprints. The Tridentichnus trackmaker was a relatively large animal with five toes on its hind feet. They are preserved in the Supai Formation and located in Arizona. The ichnospecies Steganoposaurus belli are similar footprints preserved in the Tensleep Sandstone of Wyoming.

Footnotes

References
 Lockley, Martin  and Hunt, Adrian.  Dinosaur Tracks of Western North America. Columbia University Press. 1999.

Vertebrate trace fossils